Mohammad Reza Tabesh (born 26 September 1956) is an Iranian reformist politician who is currently a member of the Parliament of Iran representing Ardakan electoral district. He was first elected as a parliament member in the 2000 election and was reelected for next four terms.

On 15 June 2012, Tabesh was elected as head of Parliament's fraction on environment, while holding office as parliamentary leader of reformists' "Imam's line fraction" from 2004 to 2012, when the fraction was dissolved.

He is nephew of former Iranian president Mohammad Khatami.

He is also a sport director, holding office as the president of Iran's Equitation Federation from 2003 until 2011.

References

1956 births
Living people
People from Ardakan
Iranian economists
Members of the 6th Islamic Consultative Assembly
Members of the 7th Islamic Consultative Assembly
Members of the 8th Islamic Consultative Assembly
Members of the 9th Islamic Consultative Assembly
Members of the 10th Islamic Consultative Assembly
Islamic Iran Participation Front politicians
Heads of reformist fractions in Islamic Consultative Assembly